William McKeighan may refer to:

 William A. McKeighan (1842–1895), Nebraska Populist politician
 William H. McKeighan (1886–1957), Michigan politician